Mardi is a given name. Notable people named Mardi include:

 Mardi Barrie (1930–2004) Scottish artist and teacher
 Mardi Dungey (1966–2019), Australian macroeconomist
 Mardi Oakley Medawar, American novelist of Cherokee descent
 Mardi Rustam (born ca. 1931), American film producer and director
 Mardi Wormhoudt (1937–2009), American politician and social worker

See also 

 Mardi (disambiguation)